The Sun-7 Chesterfield Series was an Australian touring car racing series staged at Amaroo Park in Sydney, New South Wales from 1971 to 1981. The actual series name varied from year to year, according to the commercial sponsorship secured by the series promoters, the Australian Racing Drivers Club.

Initially run for Group E Series Production Touring Cars the series switched to the new Australian Group C Touring Car regulations in 1973. The series was a precursor to the later AMSCAR touring car series which was run at Amaroo Park from 1982.

History
In 1971 Lakis Manticas won the inaugural "Sun-7" title driving a Morris Cooper S, with points being allocated evenly among the three engine capacity classes.

The tight Amaroo Park circuit suited the Holden Torana GTR XU-1s. Leading Sydney-based Torana drivers, such as the Holden Dealer Team's Colin Bond, Bob Morris, Don Holland and Allan Grice were prominent in the series. John Goss in the McLeod Ford entered Ford Falcon GT and Ford stalwart Fred Gibson were regular front-runners, while Chrysler drivers Leo Geoghegan and Doug Chivas also appeared. Colin Bond won the series three times in a row, from 1972 to 1974.

For 1975 the Sun-7 Rothmans Series was restricted to cars with an engine capacity of under 3 litres, meaning that larger engined cars such as the Holden Torana SL/R 5000 and Ford Falcon GT could no longer compete. In the 3 litre era some of the main contenders included Bo Seton's Ford Capri, Don Holland and Allan Grice in Mazda RX-3's and Bob Morris in a Triumph Dolomite.

For the 1981 series the engine capacity limit of the competing cars was increased from 3.0 litres to 3.5 litres and the following year the 3.5 litre capacity limit was removed for what was now entitled the AMSCAR.

Winners

Multiple winners

By driver

By manufacturer

References

Touring car racing series
Auto racing series in Australia